Tomescu is a Romanian language surname. It is a patronymic form of the male given name Thomas – and may refer to:
Aida Tomescu (1955), Australian contemporary artist
Alexandru Tomescu (1976), Romanian violinist
Constantina Tomescu-Dita (1970), Romanian long-distance runner
Cynthia Tomescu (1991), Romanian handballer

References 

Romanian-language surnames
Surnames from given names